Citizens for Sanity is a political action committee in the United States. The group has run ads in the lead-up to the 2022 United States elections supporting conservative causes.

Background
Citizens for Sanity claims that they are "not an ideological organization" but that they oppose "woke insanity". According to Politico, the group has worked with Republican campaign consultants to run ads in swing districts.

According to reporting by OpenSecrets, the group's board includes three members of the America First Legal Foundation, a group founded by Stephen Miller. This includes the group's treasurer, Gene Hamilton, who had previously worked to repeal DACA as part of the Trump administration. OpenSecrets describes Citizens for Sanity as a dark money group.

Advertisements
The group has run various billboards and television advertisements, generally focusing on transgender individuals and crime. For example, one of their television ads focuses on transgender people in sports, showing a trans woman participating in a track meet and defeating all of her presumably cisgender competitors. Many of the group's billboards sarcastically promote policies the group disagrees with, such as one which reads "Vote to keep our borders, jails and bathrooms open. Vote progressive", and another that reads "Too much freedom is a bad thing. Get your IRS audit today".

The group's television ads were criticized by Will Bunch in The Philadelphia Inquirer, who claimed that they were "deliberately dishonest" and often displayed violent imagery during sports games, with no warnings for potentially upsetting content. Bunch wrote that the ads by Citizens for Sanity were even more extreme than the infamous Willie Horton ad. Columnist Michael Hiltzik described one of their ads, which focused on illegal immigration, as "unbelievably racist". The ad, which ran during a 2022 playoff game between the San Diego Padres and the Los Angeles Dodgers, characterized immigrants as criminals and claimed that illegal immigration is "draining your paychecks, wrecking your schools, ruining your hospitals, threatening your family".

References

External links

United States political action committees
Conservative political advocacy groups in the United States
2022 elections in the United States